Shih Hsin University (SHU) is a private university known for its mass communication departments in Taiwan, founded in Muzha, Taipei in 1956. SHU ranked 22nd overall among top 30 liberal arts Universities in Taiwan in 2020  and secured the top 20 spot in 2021. SHU featured in the special category universities in 2022.

History
Shih Hsin University was re-established in Taiwan in 1956 as Shih Hsin School of Journalism by the journalists and publishers Cheng Shewo and Yeh Ming-hsun. Originally an institution devoted to training professional journalists, the school became a full-fledged university in August 1997.

Now it has four colleges, including the College of Journalism and Communication, the School of Management, the College of Humanities and Social Sciences, and the School of Law, and with an enrollment of around 10,000 students.

In Chinese, shih means "the world", and hsin means "new" or "news".

Schools and programs
With four colleges, Shih Hsin University has 19 departments and three graduate institutes; 19 offer bachelor's degrees, 17 offer master's degrees, and three offer PhD degrees.

 College of Journalism and Communication
 Communications (PhD)
 Journalism (BA, MA)
 Radio, TV & Film (BA, MA)
 PR & Advertising (BA, MA)
 Graphic Communication (BA, MA)
 Speech Communication (BA, MA)
 Information Communication (BA, MA)
 Digital Multimedia Arts (BA, MA)
 Communication Management (BA, MA)

 College of Management
 Information Management (BA, MA)
 Tourism (BA, MA)(ranked top in Taiwan in TSSCI)
 Finance (BA, MA)
 Public Policy and Management (only innovative Management specialization-oriented Undergraduate PPM course in Taiwan, including Management Mathematics and Finite Mathematics)(BA, MA, PhD)
 Business Management (BA, MA)

 College of Humanities and Social Sciences
 Economics (BA, MA)
 Graduate Institute for Social Transformation (MA)
 Graduate Institute for Gender Studies (MA)
 Social Psychology (BA, MA)
 English (BA, MA)
 Chinese Literature (BA, MA, PhD)
 Japanese (BA)

 College of Law（ranked 5th among Private Universities in Taiwan）
 Graduate Institute for Intellectual Property Rights (BA, MA)
 Law (BA, MA)

Cooperative/Sister schools

Shih Hsin University's notable sister/cooperative schools include but are not limited to:

Japan

 Hiroshima University 
 Ritsumeikan University 
 Saitama University
 Kokugakuin University
 Meisei University
 Tsurumi University
 Meijo University
 Kansai University of International Studies
 Mejiro University
 Rissho University
 Prefectural University of Hiroshima
 Keisen University
 University of Shimane
 Tohoku Gakuin University
Tohoko University of Community Service and Science

Korea

 Sungkyunkwan University
 SungKungHoe University
Myeongji University
Keimyung University
Busan University of Foreign Studies
Chung-Ang University
Gimcheon University

Hong Kong

 The University of Hong Kong (library partnership)
 City University of Hong Kong
 Chu Hai College of Higher Education
 Hang Seng Management College

Malaysia

 One World Hanxing College of Journalism & Communication
 New Era University College
 Han Chiang University College of Communication
 Universiti Tunku Abdul Rahman
 In-House Multimedia College

Europe

Griffith College
 Tomas Bata University in Zlín
 Roma Tre University
Nicolaus Copernicus University
University of Information Technology and Management in Rzeszow
Lomonosov Moscow State University
ISTC Strategies and Communications
University of the West of England
Liepaja University
Pan-European University
University of Presov

USA

 University of South Florida
 John Marshall Law School
 University of Missouri 
 University of Kansas 
 California State University at Fullerton 
 California State University at Los Angeles 
 Juniata College
 University of Wisconsin-River Falls
 Southern New Hampshire University
 Saginaw Valley State University
 State University of New York at Fredonia
 Chiao Hsin Chinese Language School

Oceania

 Swinburne University of Technology

Notable alumni
 Bianca Bai, model and actress
 Chen Chu, President of Control Yuan
 Claire Kuo, singer and television host
 Justin Chou, member of Legislative Yuan (2005–2012)
 Lai Shin-yuan, Minister of Mainland Affairs Council (2008–2012) and Chinese Taipei's representative to the World Trade Organization (2012–2016)
 Lee Chia-fen, educator and politician
 Lin Shu-fen, member of 7th, 8th and 9th Legislative Yuan
 Megan Lai, actress and singer
 Sandrine Pinna, actress
 Wang Shaw-lan, businessperson

University presidents
Chang Shewo (1956–1975)
Hung Wei-pu (1975–1980)
Chou Liang-yen (1980–1981)
Chang Kai-yuan (1981–1990)
Lin Nien-sheng (1990–1991)
 (1991–2001)
 (2001–2008)
 (2008–2014)
Wu Yung-chien (2014–present)

Chorus
The Shih Hsin University Chorus was established on March 22, 1965. It offers scholastic performances, a Winter Music Camp, external performances in spring vacation, and annual performances in June.

Transportation

Main campus

MRT 
  Taipei Metro  Wanfang Hospital station
  Taipei Metro  Jingmei station
  Taipei Metro  Dapinglin station
  Taipei Metro  Guozikou station

Shanghai college

MRT 
  Shanghai Metro Line 10/ Line 11 Jiaotong University station

See also
 List of universities in Taiwan
U9 League

References

External links

Official site

 
International League of Peoples' Struggle
1956 establishments in Taiwan
Educational institutions established in 1956
Universities and colleges in Taiwan
Universities and colleges in Taipei
Technical universities and colleges in Taiwan